The General's Daughter may refer to:
The General's Daughter (novel), a 1992 novel by Nelson DeMille
The General's Daughter (film), a 1999 American crime film
The General's Daughter (TV series), a 2019 Philippine television series